Karel Prohl (born 24 December 1947) is a Czech weightlifter. He competed in the men's bantamweight event at the 1976 Summer Olympics.

References

External links
 

1947 births
Living people
Czech male weightlifters
Olympic weightlifters of Czechoslovakia
Weightlifters at the 1976 Summer Olympics
People from Loket
World Weightlifting Championships medalists
Sportspeople from the Karlovy Vary Region